Cerro Pelado may refer to:

Places
 , Uruguay
 Cerro Pelado, Ngäbe-Buglé, Panama
 Cerro Pelado, Tlalpan, in the Sierra de Ajusco-Chichinauhtzin mountain range, Mexico
 Cerro Pelado, a barrio in the Maldonado Department of southeastern Uruguay.
 Cerro Pelado, a peak in the Jemez Mountains of New Mexico, in the United States

Other uses
 Cerro Pelado Dam, Córdoba Province, Argentina
 Cerro Pelado International, a UWW wrestling event in Cuba
 Cerro Pelado Fire, a wildfire in the Jemez Mountains of New Mexico, in the United States

See also
Mount Baldy (disambiguation)